The men's 4 x 400 metres relay at the 2011 IPC Athletics World Championships was held at the QEII Stadium on 29 January 2011.

Medalists

T53/54
T53 = normal upper limb function, no abdominal, leg or lower spinal function.

T54 = normal upper limb function, partial to normal trunk function, may have significant function of the lower limbs.

Results

Heats

Key:   CR = Championship Record, AR = Continental Record, R 163.3 = Leaving the lane,  R 170.14 = Passing of the baton outside the take-over zone

Final

References
Complete Results Book from the 2011 IPC Athletics World Championships
Official site of the 2011 IPC Athletics World Championships

4 x 400 metres relay
4 × 400 metres relay at the World Para Athletics Championships